The 1956 San Jose State Spartans football team represented San Jose State College during the 1956 NCAA University Division football season.

San Jose State played as an Independent in 1956. The team was led by seventh-year head coach Bob Bronzan, and played home games at Spartan Stadium in San Jose, California. The Spartans finished the 1956 season with a record of two wins, seven losses and one tie (2–7–1). Overall, the team was outscored by its opponents 186–301 for the season. This was the last season under Coach Bronzan, finishing his San Jose State career with a record of 32–30–5, a winning percentage of .515.

Schedule

Team players in the NFL
The following San Jose State players were selected in the 1957 NFL Draft.

Notes

References

San Jose State
San Jose State Spartans football seasons
San Jose State Spartans football